Brace Up is a 1918 American silent thriller film directed by Elmer Clifton and starring Herbert Rawlinson, Claire Du Brey and Alfred Allen.

Cast
 Herbert Rawlinson as Henry Court
 Claire Du Brey as Ellen Miles
 Alfred Allen as Col. Court
 Sam De Grasse as National Jim

References

Bibliography
James Robert Parish & Michael R. Pitts. Film directors: a guide to their American films. Scarecrow Press, 1974.

External links
 

1918 films
1910s thriller films
1910s English-language films
American silent feature films
American thriller films
American black-and-white films
Universal Pictures films
Films directed by Elmer Clifton
Silent thriller films
1910s American films